Bolusao Watershed Forest Reserve is a reserve in Barangay Bolusao, Lawaan, Eastern Samar, Philippines.

Geography

The Bolusao Watershed Forest Reserve is situated in the southern part of the island of Samar and lies within the coordinates 11°22'N and 125°20'E. Having an area of 4,055 hectares, it was declared as a watershed forest reserve via Proclamation Number 106 on 10 December 1992, for inclusion in the National Integrated Protected Areas System (NIPAS) by virtue of R.A. 7586 (DENR, 2003). It is under the administrative jurisdiction of the municipality of Lawaan, Eastern Samar.

Barangay Bolusao
Bolusao is the most populated barangay in Lawaan, Eastern Samar, Philippines. It is centrally located right at the east-west Samar boundary. It serves as the premier barangay of Eastern Samar for people coming from Tacloban City or Province of Samar traversing Samar Circumferencial Road. Hence, dubbed as 'The Gateway to Eastern Samar'.

Its population as determined by the 2015 Census was 1,626. This represented 12.76% of the total population of Lawaan.

Infrastructure
Bolusao Irrigation-DD (Diversion Dams)

Tabuk Farm to Market Road

Amanjuray Hydroelectric Power

Biodiversity
The Philippine tarsier is known to be one of the smallest primates, categorized as an endangered species in the area. This nocturnal animal has been sighted at the Bolusao watershed and adjacent San Isidro village. The avifauna of the Bulosao River Watershed Forest Reserve is virtually unknown, but it is likely to be similar to those of the other IBAs on Samar, the Mt Cabalantian-Mt Capotoan complex and the Mt Yacgun-Mt Sohoton complex. The extensive forests in this IBA therefore probably support important populations of several of the threatened and restricted-range species of the Mindanao and Eastern Visayas Endemic Bird Area.

Tourism
There are four waterfalls in the Bolusao watershed which lies within the Samar Island Buffer Zone. These falls are Amandaraga, Pangi, Amanjuray, and Ban-Awan Falls located in Barangay Bolusao. Amandaraga and Ban-awan Falls are the main source of the municipality's water system. Meanwhile, Amanjuray Falls is the alternate hydro-electric power source of Lawaan wherein a mini-hydro power plant is existent nearby.

References

Geography of Eastern Samar